School of Rock is a music education program. This for-profit educational company operates and franchises after-school music instruction schools in the United States, Chile, Canada, Brazil, Peru, Colombia, South Africa, Mexico, Australia, Paraguay, Taiwan, Ireland, Spain, Portugal, and the Philippines. School of Rock currently has 307 open locations in fourteen countries serving more than 55,000 students.

Though they offer a pre-school introduction to music for children age two through six, the majority of their students are in a performance-based program where students are accepted at any skill level, with the goal getting them on stage, playing a concert before a paying audience. The most skilled students in each school form a band and play concerts in their city, and the top students from each school compete to become a member of an "All-Star" band and tour regionally. They have recently expanded to offering career development for working bands, and "Grad School" for adult amateur musicians. Successful musicians occasionally serve as "Guest Professors" and perform with the students.

History
Paul Green began giving traditional individual music lessons in his home in 1996. He invited a group of his students to sit in, or "jam", with his own band with disappointing results. But by the third week, he found that the students who played in a group had advanced much more than the students who received only traditional solo instruction. He modified his teaching method to supplement traditional instruction with group practice, with the goal of putting on a concert. He compared it to the difference between "...shooting hoops and playing basketball". In 1999, the most advanced students played their first public concert at an art gallery. 

He took out a loan for $7000 in 2002 and established a permanent location for the first Paul Green School of Rock Music in a dilapidated building at 1320 Race Street, Philadelphia that has since been demolished. The location had a number of small rooms for individual instrumental instruction as well as larger performance spaces for full band practices. Spin magazine sent The Smashing Pumpkins guitarist James Iha to profile Green and the school for the May 2002 issue.
Green chose to name the school after himself to avoid confusion with the Herbie Hancock television program and to use his measure of local fame, but always referred to the program as "Rock School" and answered the phone using the phrase. Additionally, Green established the domain SchoolofRock.com in 2001, first archived 24 May 2002.

In 2002, a crew from the Viacom television channel VH1 filmed for four days at the Philadelphia location for a proposed reality television series. After the shoot, the producers stopped returning Green's phone calls. In January 2003, filmmakers Don Argott and Sheena M. Joyce attended a concert by the students, and decided to make a documentary about the school five minutes after the concert started.
They met with Green the next day and began shooting video one day later, intending to follow an entire school year. Midway through the nine months of shooting what became Rock School, they learned that the Viacom movie studio Paramount would be releasing a fictional film to be called School of Rock featuring Jack Black as Dewey Finn, a would-be rock star teaching children to play rock music. Many critics claimed that Black's characterization was based on Green's man-child persona though screenwriter Mike White claimed that he had "...never heard of Paul Green before". Green preferred the documentary, saying it "...opened a lot of other doors, corporate partnerships, and given us access to the rock stars that we play with. It was like Jack Black was the nationwide commercial for us and our movie was the industry cred." He considered a lawsuit, but decided against it, reasoning that the School benefited from the film saying "I considered suing, but what are you going to do? It's better, in a karmic sense, to just reap the rewards."

In 2002, Green had more than 100 students, and in order to maintain an acceptable student to teacher ratio, opened an additional location in Downingtown, Pennsylvania. Expansion continued in counties around Philadelphia, then into southern New Jersey and Delaware. Green's dentist, Dr. Joseph Roberts, became chairman of the Board of the School and provided funding to expand to San Francisco, New York City, Austin and Salt Lake City.

Green was bought out in 2009 by investor Sterling Partners and the management team he had brought in, headed by former Clear Channel executive Matt Ross. Ross remained CEO until 2010, managing the company's expansion and private equity acquisition, when he was replaced as CEO by former McDonald's Ventures executive Chris Catalano, who had previously led the expansion their Chipotle and Redbox businesses. The name was shortened to School of Rock. In January 2012, the headquarters relocated from New Jersey to the Chicago suburb of Burr Ridge with a staff of 14, and an additional 11 employees in Denver. The company has 1,500 part-time employees, primarily music instructors in its owned and franchised locations.

In June 2014, Catalano was replaced with Dzana Homan, who had been Chief Operating Officer of the Goddard School child care centers, and had previous experience as CEO of Huntington Learning Centers and Futurekids.

In April 2006, Guitar Player magazine publisher MPN announced a quarterly School of Rock magazine intended to focus on classic rock and musical tips for readers age twelve to eighteen. It lasted less than a year, closing during a contraction of the publishing industry.

Green's non-compete agreement expired in 2013, and he announced plans to open a Paul Green Rock Academy in Woodstock, New York to serve ages 8 to 18, as well as a Woodstock College of Music in Ulster County with Woodstock Music Festival promoter Michael Lang.

In 2017, current CEO Rob Price joined the company.

Franchising
The CNN Money website featured School of Rock as one of their Five Hot Franchises on 12 February 2013, stating that there are "more than 10,000 kids enrolled in 105 locations in 31 states, as well as Mexico." A January 2014 profile of CEO Dzana Homan in Entrepreneur magazine increased that number to "more than 145 School of Rock franchises in eight countries".

The company has plans to grow to more than 180 locations worldwide by the end of 2015.

25 of the locations were owned by the company as of 16 December 2012, the rest by franchisees. Purchasing a franchise requires an initial investment of $137,350 to $304,100 according to a review by Entrepreneur magazine that ranked it #211 of their 2013 Top 500 Franchise Opportunities, up from #289 in 2012, and #318 in 2011. This estimate includes a renewable ten-year franchise fee of $49,500. The franchisee also pays an 8% annual royalty fee, and is required to have a net worth of $300,000, and $100,000 cash available. Each location will require from 14 to 21 employees. The majority of the employees are music teachers who are also working musicians.

The franchisee receives training in running the business, IT support including a website, assistance with real estate selection and designing the franchise location, grand opening and on-going marketing support, discounts on music equipment and a protected territory. The IT support includes access to a customized task management and internal social productivity site.

The majority of the schools are in dedicated locations, although in January 2013, the company announced that they intend to expand their program to co-locate with music retailers, who are having difficulty competing with online retailers and frequently have surplus floor space. The Charlotte, North Carolina, location was the model, being co-located in a Sam Ash Music store but has since moved to a new location.

Curriculum

The schools operate year-round, offering a variety of programs. During the school year, they function as an after-school program, and during summer, winter and spring breaks, they offer a day camp for intensive instruction.

The Burnsville, Minnesota, location originated an early childhood music education known as "Little Wing", after the Jimi Hendrix song. Children age two to three participate with a parent in the "Rockin' Robin" class, and children age four to six participate as part of a drop-off class known as "Free Bird". The program of 45-minute sessions is being rolled out to other locations.

At age seven, students can begin weekly lessons in the instrument of their choice in "Rock 101" classes. Once a student has basic competence in an instrument, they can move to the "Performance Program" where they have a weekly one-on-one private lesson and three hours weekly of group band rehearsal that culminates in a concert before an audience.

The most skilled students of each school form a band and perform at various venues in their city, opening for established regional and national acts. The top 1% of each school can audition to become an AllStar. Many schools have songwriting and recording programs as well. In 2011, they introduced two new programs – "Band Coaching" for existing bands to improve aspects of their performance and "Epic Albums" where students spend three to four months recording their own version of Nirvana's Nevermind, Radiohead's OK Computer, Led Zeppelin IV, Green Day's Dookie and Black Sabbath's Master of Reality.

Most School instructors are working musicians with ongoing careers in rock music and a number are graduates of the program. Instructors are encouraged to stress the fundamentals of both popular music and music theory, using songs from popular bands and artists like Led Zeppelin, The Who, Pink Floyd, and music from genres such as 1980s glam metal, punk rock and grunge. The teachers generally specialize in a single instrument, though many have skills in additional instruments and students are encouraged to learn multiple instruments. Instruction is available in electric guitar, bass guitar, drums, keyboards and vocals.

The students are paired with others of similar abilities to form bands, and assigned a band coach. Dependence upon their peers is credited with being more effective than their own parents at ensuring practice discipline.

There are occasional "Guest Professor" workshops featuring accomplished musicians, which include discussions about past experiences, songwriting, live performance, and handling fame. Previous guest professors include Jon Anderson, Earl Slick, Dave Stewart, Mike Watt, former Santana drummer Michael Shrieve Peter Frampton, Roger Waters, Jackson Browne and Zack Wylde The guest may also spend time assisting the students on their technique and may perform a concert with the students.

Various locations have launched a "Grad School" program for those older than 18 who wish to participate in a performance based music education program. Five weeks of 45-minute private lessons are followed by 10 weeks of professionally guided two-hour rehearsals leading up to a pair of full length concerts.

Locations take advantage of regional opportunities. In 2014, School of Rock Chicago launched Rock City Camp: An Opera of Rock in cooperation with The Second City to create an original stage production to be performed at the Athenaeum Theatre. In 2014, they again cooperated to produce a production of Tommy by The Who. The Portland location has an annual concert of music by Portland bands called Best! of Portland. Every song in the 2014 edition of the show featured a member of the original band, including The Thermals and Typhoon.

In 2012, the School branched out with a variation on the traditional Catskill Mountains summer camp with Metal Camp: Mayhem in the Mountains, an intensive week-long event for musicians age 12 to 18, leading up to a concert. The Guest Professors for the 2012 event were "Metal" Mike Chlasciak - guitarist with Halford, Sebastian Bach and Testament, a teacher at the Chatham location and Jason McMaster - bassist with Watchtower, Dangerous Toys and Ignitor who teaches at the School of Rock Austin. Chlasciak was again the Guest Professor. Time Out: New York ranked it as one of the best summer camps for kids near New York City.

Fees vary depending on program participation and school location, but it is in the range of "a couple hundred dollars a month." As of May 2012, enrollment at the Wichita, Kansas location started at $225 a month, and $250 a month at the Cleveland location as of July 2012. The School has partnered with MySafeSchool to ensure the safety of their students.

In August 2010, Wendy Winks and Carl Restivo, the former heads of the Hollywood branch, formed The Rock School Scholarship Fund, a tax-deductible 501(c)3 charitable organization to provide instruments and tuition for deserving students of any rock music school in the United States.

Performances
The school has "the ultimate goal of performing live in front of real crowds" and the official motto of the school is "To inspire the world to rock…on stage and in life". The founder of the school stated in the documentary about the school "Don't come to watch kids play music. Come to watch kids play music well".

The School year consists of up to three seasons, each composed of up to five different theme shows (depending on the size of the branch). Each show is dedicated to a particular artist, band, genre, time period or historical event. Although some shows are more technically demanding, students can sign up for any show no matter what the age or skill level (although approval by the show's director is occasionally required). Shows usually consist of 20 to 25 songs chosen by the show's director (usually one of the teachers at the school) to make a ninety-minute concert. Three-hour rehearsals are held every week in preparation. The shows are performed at local clubs twice, usually on Friday and Saturday nights, and sometimes Saturday night and Sunday afternoon; however, some of the schools have their own venue for performances. Tickets are sold to defray the rental cost of the venue, usually for $10.

Previously performed shows across all School of Rock locations include Rush vs. Dream Theater, Metallica's Master of Puppets, Big Four of Thrash Metal, Classic metal, Indie rock, The Black Keys vs. The White Stripes, Black Sabbath, Santana, Ozzfest, Bonaroo, Warped Tour, Best Show Ever! progressive rock, The Allman Brothers Band, Guns N' Roses vs. Mötley Crüe, Hair metal, Guns N' Roses vs. Aerosmith, Corporate rock, Led Zeppelin, Queen, The Beatles, Metallica, Iron Maiden vs. Metallica, King Crimson, Jimi Hendrix, The 27 Club, Devo, Van Halen, Pink Floyd's The Wall, Punk and Reggae, Funk & Soul, Thrash Metal, Radiohead, Muse vs. Radiohead, Eagles vs. Fleetwood Mac, Rocky Horror vs. Hedwig, AC/DC, Best of the 80s/90s/00s, Punk rock, The Clash vs Ramones, Jesus Christ Superstar, The Who's Tommy, British Invasion, Iron Maiden vs. Judas Priest, Frank Zappa, Old School Blues, Women Who Rock, British rock, The Doors, Grunge, Alice in Chains vs Pearl Jam, Guitar Gods, Yes, Dave Grohl vs Jack White, Rush, Red Hot Chili Peppers, David Bowie, Prince, Prince vs Michael Jackson, Green Day, The Clash, The Police, Talking Heads, CBGB, Bruce Springsteen, Motown, The Last Waltz and many more.

Some locations produce a Best of Season show that is a compilation of songs from previous shows, usually to raise tuition for a scholarship. Locations are a mixture of franchised and company-operated, some having been established as independent entities prior to the founding of the Paul Green School of Rock Music and maintain their own traditions and values.

Five Dallas, Texas School of Rock locations will be performing at various Deep Ellum locations over Memorial Day weekend as part of the 3rd annual Rockstravaganza. More than 500 students will be performing as part of 80 bands. Venues are Trees, Club Dada, Boiler Room, Liquid Lounge and 3 Links beginning 14 April 2013.

On 28 June 2013, the multi-day Gemba competition was launched at Milwaukee's Summerfest music festival. Bands from 200 School of Rock locations traveled to compete in a Battle of Bands. The 2013 edition was judged by Slim Jim Phantom of Stray Cats, David Bowie guitarist Earl Slick, Jim Peterik of Survivor and The Ides of March, Bruce Kulick of Kiss, "Metal" Mike Chlasciak of Rob Halford's band, Eric Bloom of Blue Öyster Cult and Nathan Willett & Matt Maust of the Cold War Kids. The 2013 competition was won by the Seattle School of Rock.

AllStars
The School of Rock AllStars is a select group of students comprising the top .1 percent of the students in the program, selected via an audition process where the student submits a five-minute video clip. The student answers four questions: "What is your favorite thing about School of Rock?", "What is your best School of Rock moment?", "How has music changed your life", and "Why do you want to be an AllStar". They must also include a performance of one Led Zeppelin, Beatles, or Rolling Stones song, and one solo song of their own choice. Originally, there was a single national AllStars team, but since expanding the number of schools, there are AllStar teams for seven different regions to keep tour length manageable. Applicants to represent a particular region are selected by the music directors of School location from a different region.

Once chosen, the students practice together during the school holiday period. They tour such venues as B.B. King's in Times Square, The Knitting Factory and Whisky a Go Go in Los Angeles and New York City, The Roxy and Crash Mansion in Los Angeles, Stubbs in Austin, various Hard Rock Cafes and House of Blues, the Rock and Roll Hall of Fame and many of the biggest festivals in the country such as Lollapalooza, Summerfest and Austin City Limits.

The 2010 AllStars tour was billed as "Live-Aid Remade" with a set list drawn from the original Live Aid concert 25 years previously. The 2011 AllStars "Rock The House" tour was a benefit for Ronald McDonald House Charities. The 21 city 2012 AllStars tour was a benefit for the Love Hope Strength Foundation and included multiple dates at Milwaukee's Summerfest, Connecticut's Gathering of the Vibes and the Van's Warped Tour.

They often tour and play with successful rock musicians, such as the Butthole Surfers, Slash, Les Paul, Brendon Small, LeAnn Rimes, Perry Farrell, Jon Anderson, Peter Frampton, Eddie Vedder, Alice Cooper, Adrian Belew, Napoleon Murphy Brock, Stewart Copeland, John Wetton, Jeff "Skunk" Baxter, Ike Willis and Ann Wilson. Students have performed with Roger Waters' on his 2010 tour of The Wall.

The 2013 AllStars list was announced 1 April 2013 and included 153 performers from across the United States and Mexico. The performers were assembled into six bands, and played multiple dates including all the days of both Gathering of the Vibes and Lollapalooza festivals. The tour was once again a benefit for the Love Hope Strength Foundation.

Eric Svalgard, a teacher at Green's original School of Rock location and owner of the Wilmington, Delaware location, assembled a special "Z Team" from nine School of Rock locations to travel to Bad Doberon, Germany to play the 25th Zappanale, a festival of music by and associated with Frank Zappa. The Z Team both opened and closed the show.

Notable graduates 
Chicago School graduate Michael Weisman was competing in the second season of the Oxygen reality television series The Glee Project. On the next-to-last episode of the series that aired 7 August 2012, he was eliminated from the competition.

Two of Paul Green's first group of students were siblings Eric and Julie Slick, who became the drummer and bassist of the Adrian Belew Power Trio, after they played with Belew during his Guest Professor gig at the Philadelphia School in 2006. Eric Slick is also the drummer of the band Dr. Dog. Belew said in a profile in Guitar Player magazine that "These kids give me energy, and make me feel young all over again. They really inspire me to create, and we're just starting."

Philadelphia student C. J. Tywoniak appeared in the film Rock of Ages as the guitarist in the band Wolfgang Von Colt. Fellow Philadelphia student Madi Diaz's songs have appeared in the television series Drop Dead Diva and Army Wives, and was named by Paste magazine as one of the Top 10 Buzziest Acts of SXSW 2009. Both were featured in the documentary film Rock School.

Chicago student Luke Sangerman is the youngest person to become a permanent performer with the Blue Man Group, beating 150 professionals in an open audition for the Chicago production at age 16.

The Los Angeles location's House Band was the backing band for the "Rock Music" episode of the American television program Dancing with the Stars in 2012.

Dallas student Dalton Rapattoni finished 3rd on the fifteenth season of American Idol and was part of the band IM5.

Boulder student Halle Tomlinson appeared on the 11th season of The Voice. She joined Alicia Keys' team and was eliminated in the battle rounds.

New Canaan student, Dante Melucci, was cast as Freddy Hamilton, in School of Rock: The Musical on Broadway. He played the drummer in the original cast from previews until 8 May 2016. In the summer of 2015, School of Rock West LA multi-instrumentalist student Jersey Sullivan was cast as James (Security) in School of Rock: The Musical on Broadway. Sullivan also starred as Zack Mooneyham (Guitarist) while the regular cast member was away.

Roslyn, New York student, Madison Beer, a singer, performed with the program at age 13 and was discovered by Justin Bieber on YouTube just three years later at age 16.

Lydia Night met members of her bands Pretty Little Demons (Marlhy Murphy) and The Regrettes (Genessa Gariano, Sage Chavis, Maxx Morando) during their attendance at The School of Rock.

Sandy, Utah student Maddie Rice, guitarist, has twice toured with K-Pop star Taeyang, occasionally performs with Rubblebucket, and is a member of the house band, Jon Batiste and Stay Human, on The Late Show with Stephen Colbert.
 Fellow student, Nick Petty, guitarist, has toured with second place American Idol finisher, David Archuleta.

A native of Philadelphia, Courtney Cox first started playing guitar around the age of 13. When she turned 15, she enrolled at The Paul Green School of Rock Music. During her tenure there, she performed in various U.S. tours with established acts such as Jon Anderson and Adrian Belew. She shared the stage with other performers such as George Lynch and Perry Farrell. During that time, Cox co-founded an all-female tribute band called Queen Diamond (tribute band to King Diamond).[2]

References

External links
 School of Rock official website

Companies based in Cook County, Illinois
Franchises
Educational institutions established in 1998
For-profit music schools in the United States
Music schools in California
Music schools in Colorado
Music schools in Connecticut
Music schools in Delaware
Music schools in Florida
Music schools in Georgia (U.S. state)
Music schools in Idaho
Music schools in Illinois
Music schools in Massachusetts
Music schools in Maryland
Music schools in Michigan
Music schools in Minnesota
Music schools in Missouri
Music schools in North Carolina
Music schools in Nebraska
Music schools in New Jersey
Music schools in New York (state)
Music schools in Ohio
Music schools in Oregon
Music schools in Pennsylvania
Music schools in Tennessee
Music schools in Texas
Music schools in Utah
Music schools in Virginia
Music schools in Washington (state)
Music schools in Wisconsin
Music schools in Mexico
1998 establishments in Pennsylvania